The 1904 Kendall Orange and Black football team represented Henry Kendall College—now known as the University of Tulsa—as an independent during the 1904 college football season. Led by S. L. Morley in his first and only season as head coach, the team compiled a record of 0–2–1.

Schedule

References

Kendall
Tulsa Golden Hurricane football seasons
College football winless seasons
Kendall Orange and Black football